Australian country music trio The McClymonts have released six studio albums, one compilation, one extended play, and twenty-seven singles.

Albums

Studio albums

Compilation albums

Extended plays

Singles

Notes

Guest Vocals

Music videos

References

Country music discographies
Discographies of Australian artists